Shea Fahy (born 6 October 1962) is an Irish Gaelic football coach and former player. At club level he played with Sarsfields and Nemo Rangers and was a member of the Kildare and Cork senior football teams. Fahy usually lined out at midfield.

Army career

Fahy was an officer in the Irish Army. He was based in Collins Barracks, Cork and result leading him to join the Cork team.

Playing career

Fahy first played Gaelic football at club level with the Sarsfields club in Newbridge. After progressing through the various underage teams he went on to win County Championship titles with the club's senior team in 1982 and 1986. By this stage he had also made an impression on the inter-county scene, having joined the Kildare senior football team in 1982. Fahy subsequently transferred to the Nemo Rangers club in Cork and enjoyed a hugely successful period there, culminating with an All-Ireland Club Championship title in 1994. His performances with Nemo earned his inclusion on the Cork senior football team and he won consecutive All-Ireland Championship titles in 1989 and 1990. Fahy was named man of the match in the 1990 All-Ireland final defeat of Meath, before ending the year by being named Footballer of the Year. His other honours with Cork include seven Munster Championship titles and a National League title.

Coaching career

In retirement from playing Fahy has become involved in coaching and team management, most notably with the Erin's Own club.

Honours

Sarsfields
Kildare Senior Football Championship: 1982, 1986

Nemo Rangers
All-Ireland Senior Club Football Championship: 1994
Munster Senior Club Football Championship: 1987, 1993
Cork Senior Football Championship: 1987, 1988, 1993

Kildare
Leinster Under-21 Football Championship: 1982

Cork
All-Ireland Senior Football Championship: 1989, 1990
Munster Senior Football Championship: 1987, 1988, 1989, 1990, 1993, 1994, 1995
National Football League: 1988-89

References

1962 births
Living people
Cork inter-county Gaelic footballers
Gaelic football coaches
Gaelic football managers
Gaelic football selectors
Munster inter-provincial Gaelic footballers
Nemo Rangers Gaelic footballers
People from Newbridge, County Kildare
Sarsfields (Kildare) Gaelic footballers
Texaco Footballers of the Year
Winners of two All-Ireland medals (Gaelic football)